Cao Yu (1910–1996) was a Chinese playwright.

Cao Yu may also refer to:

 Cao Yu (artist) (born 1988), Chinese contemporary artist
 Cao Yu (cinematographer) (born 1974), Chinese cinematographer
 Cao Yu (Three Kingdoms) (died 278), prince of the state of Cao Wei

See also
 Cao Yuan
 Cao Yue